Rotner is a surname. Notable people with the surname include:

Karol Rotner, Israeli footballer
Pamela Rotner Sakamoto, American historian and writer

See also
Rottner